Aromobates molinarii (commonly known as the Las Playitas rocket frog) is a species of frog of the family Aromobatidae. It is endemic to Venezuelan Andes near Cascada de Bailadores and Las Playitas in the Mérida state.
Its natural habitats are dry evergreen montane forests, where it lives along slow-flowing streams. The male protects the eggs that are laid on land. After hatching, the male carries the tadpoles on his back to water where they develop further.

Aromobates molinarii is threatened by habitat loss caused by intensive agriculture.

References

molinarii
Amphibians of Venezuela
Endemic fauna of Venezuela
Taxonomy articles created by Polbot
Amphibians described in 1985